Gonzalo Rabuñal Rios (born 1 August 1984 in Arteixo) is a Spanish professional road bicycle racer who last rode for UCI Professional Continental team Xacobeo–Galicia.

Major results

2010
 1st  Mountains classification, Tour of the Basque Country

References

External links 

1984 births
Living people
Sportspeople from the Province of A Coruña
People from A Coruña (comarca)
Cyclists from Galicia (Spain)
Spanish Vuelta a España stage winners
Spanish male cyclists